Hengameh (in Persian هنگامه) is a Persian given name for females. It may refer to:

Persons
Hengameh Golestan (born 1952), Iranian photographer
Hengameh Mofid (born 1956), Iranian film/theater actress, director, and dramatist 
Hengameh Shahidi (born 1976), Iranian journalist, political activist, and political prisoner

Other uses
Hengameh (film), 1968 film by Iranian Armenian film director Samuel Khachikian